KWAR (89.9 FM, "Your Sound") is a radio station broadcasting a Top 40 (CHR) music format. Licensed to Waverly, Iowa, United States, the station is currently owned by Wartburg College.

History
The Federal Communications Commission issued a construction permit for the station on April 27, 2005. The station was assigned the call sign KWER on June 25, 2007, and on April 8, 2008, changed its call sign to the current KWAR. On August 7, 2008, the station received its license to cover.

References

External links

Radio stations established in 2008
Modern rock radio stations in the United States
WAR
Wartburg College